Dr. Imraan Faruque  is an American who is most known as a designer and author in the unmanned aerial vehicle (UAV) field.  He is the designer responsible for a variety of UAVs, including several currently operational in Iraq, the most well-known being the R-series UAVs which are based on commercial airframes, along with work on Insitu's ScanEagle.  These vehicles are normally deployed as a part of reconnaissance missions as they are unarmed but carry either a significant camera or FLIR unit.

Personal life
He was born on August 9, 1984 in Alexandria, Virginia, but soon moved to Charlottesville, Virginia, where he lived until 2002 when he moved to Blacksburg, Virginia, where he earned a B.S. in aerospace engineering at Virginia Tech.  Also was in US FIRST robotics competition. Imraan is the brother of fellow Virginia Tech graduate, Ruel Faruque, a researcher and team member for the Virginia Tech DARPA Urban Challenge team. On July 16, 2016 he was married to Rachel Mumbert.

Organizational involvement
Faruque is a member of the American Institute of Aeronautics and Astronautics, an alumnus founding member of the Royal Aeronautical Society's Human Powered Aircraft Group at Virginia Tech, a Minta Martin Endowed Fellow at the University of Maryland, and is reported to do advisory work for various government and university agencies in unmanned aerial vehicle design and flight test at the Army's Fort Benning, GA; Eglin Air Force Base, FL; Tyndall Air Force Base, FL; and Patuxent River Naval Air Station, MD .  He serves as a worship leader for Chi Alpha Campus Ministries.  Imraan is a post-doctorate scholar of the Virginia University of Maryland Autonomous Vehicle Laboratory  where he has worked on "insect-like robots."

Published works
Faruque's published works include 
Initial Development of a Vision-Controlled Diesel-Fueled Unmanned Aerial System (which he briefed at the 2006 AIAA Midatlantic Regional Student Conference), 
Development of an Autonomous Aerial Reconnaissance Platform at Virginia Tech,
Flight Test Bed for Visual Tracking of Small UAVs.
Control-Oriented Reduced Order Modeling of Dipteran Flapping Flight 
A draft manuscript of a book entitled UAV Analysis, Design, and Piloting for Engineers has seen use in senior design courses at Virginia Tech.

References

External links
Imraan's Myspace Music Page
Imraan's Facebook Profile

Writers from Charlottesville, Virginia
Living people
Fellows of the American Institute of Aeronautics and Astronautics
1984 births